José Mesiano (born 1 May 1942) is an Argentine footballer. He played in six matches for the Argentina national football team from 1963 to 1965. He was also part of Argentina's squad for the 1963 South American Championship.

References

External links
 
 

1942 births
Living people
Argentine footballers
Argentina international footballers
Place of birth missing (living people)
Association football midfielders
Argentinos Juniors footballers
Rosario Central footballers
Club Atlético Platense footballers
Sport Boys footballers
C.D. Cuenca footballers
Argentine expatriate footballers
Expatriate footballers in Peru
Expatriate footballers in Ecuador